Polietina is a genus within the Diptera family Muscidae.

Species
P. major Albuquerque, 1956
P. nigra (Couri & Carvalho, 1996)
P. orbitalis (Srein, 1904)
P. prima (Couri & Carvalho, 1990)
P. pruinosa (Macquart, 1846)
P. rubella (Wulp, 1896)
P. wulpi Couri & Carvalho, 1997

References

Muscidae
Diptera of North America
Diptera of South America
Brachycera genera